Clinch County High School is a public high school located in Homerville, Georgia, United States. It is part of the Clinch County School District.

Athletics 

CCHS won the "Triple Crown" in the 1988–89 school year by winning state titles in football, boys' basketball, and baseball in one academic school year.

Football

CCHS has won eight state football championships (1988, 1991, 2002, 2004, 2010, 2015, 2017, 2018).  The CCHS football team holds the high-school record for least yards rushing (117) allowed in a 15-game season. The teams’ wins in 2017 and 2018 gave the school its first back-to-back state football titles.

Baseball

CCHS has six state championships in baseball (1986, 1987, 1989, 1991, 1992, 2003).

Boys’ & Girls’ Basketball

The CCHS basketball teams have two state championships in boys' basketball (1987, 1989), and four state championships in girls' basketball (1976, 1987, 1991, 1993).

Other Sports
CCHS also competes in other sports including girls’ softball, boys’ and girls’ track, and boys’ and girls’ tennis.

Notable alumni
 Boris Lee -girls football player
 Jonathan Smith - NFL player

References

External links
 Clinch County School District website

Public high schools in Georgia (U.S. state)
Schools in Clinch County, Georgia